Chapel is a hamlet in the English county of Cumbria.

Chapel is located on the A591 road between Bassenthwaite and Bassenthwaite Lake. The Cumbria Way crosses the main road at Chapel.
Today it is a beautiful camping site and national park.

External links

 
Camping site, National park Chapel in Cumbria

Hamlets in Cumbria
Allerdale